Le Castle Vania is an electronic dance music project created by Atlanta-based DJ Dylan Eiland.

Background 
Eiland began DJing at warehouse parties and raves in Atlanta at age 16. He adopted the name "Le Castle Vania" with the release of his remix for Snowden's song "Black Eyes" in 2006. From 2007 to 2012, Le Castle Vania hosted the "Fuck Yesss" indie electronica dance parties at venues such as The Drunken Unicorn and Masquerade in Atlanta.

Eiland uses a simple setup, including a laptop computer, a mixer, and two turntables. He writes his songs on his laptop, often while traveling on airplanes, and prefers to play a larger number of his original work compared to his remixes. At one point, his remix of Black Eyes by Snowden was the most requested song at a New Zealand radio station. He has also remixed songs by Daft Punk, Kaskade, and Klaxons.

The sound of Le Castle Vania is specifically intended to avoid the common southern influence of crunk, and focuses primarily on Euro-electro influences.

In 2008, URB Magazine included Le Castle Vania in their list of "Next 100" artists to watch.

In 2014, Eiland contributed to the soundtrack of the film John Wick with 4 original songs. He had returned to compose original music for John Wick: Chapter 2 as well as making a cameo appearance as a DJ in the film.

On October 21, 2015, Eiland contributed three new songs to the video game Payday 2 as a part of the game's yearly anniversary event, Crimefest, and later contributed two more songs in October 2018 as part of that year's Crimefest, dubbed "Breaking News."

Related projects 
Eiland is the founder of Always Never, an electronic music record label and music/nightlife event production company.

He is the founder of the Fuck Yesss party held in Atlanta, Georgia.

He has a side project called Lies In Disguise. Eiland also releases more bass-music-oriented productions under the alias Twin Moons.

Discography - Le Castle Vania 
 "Dieselboy - NVD (Le Castle Vania + Computer Club)"
 "Nobody Gets Out Alive!"
 "La Roux - In For The Kill (Le Castle Vania Remix)"
 "The Virgins – Rich Girls (Le Castle Vania's Spring Break No Parents Remix)"
 "Designer Drugs – Back Up In This (Le Castle Vania + Rrrump + Computer Club Remix)"
 "Le Castle Vania - The Voice Of Treason"
 "Fukkk Offf - Rave is King (Le Castle Vania Remix)"
 "Walter Meego - Through A Keyhole (Le Castle Vania Remix)"
 "Le Castle Vania - Zero Machine"
 "Le Castle Vania + Computer Club – The Messiah"
 "GRUM – Go Back (Le Castle Vania Remix)"
 "Kill The Noise – Hey You (Le Castle Vania Remix)"
 Troubletron RMX EP
 "Scanners - Bombs (Le Castle Vania Remix)"
 "120 Days - Come Out (Le Castle Vania Remixes)"
 Troubletron EP
 "Snowden - Black Eyes (Le Castle Vania Remix)"
 "Turn It Down" - Kaskade (Le Castle Vania Remix)
 Prophication EP
 Feels Like Fire EP
 John Wick Original Motion Picture Soundtrack (contributor)
 I Want You/What We Do EP (with Addison)
 You Know My Name EP (with LUMBERJVCK)
 "Wild Child" - Stereoheroes (Le Castle Vania Remix)
 "Rrrump - Chubby Decker (Le Castle Vania Remix + Street Lurkin Remix)"
 "D.I.M. - Is You (Le Castle Vania Remix)"
 "DJ Falcon + Thomas Bangalter - Together (Le Castle Vania + Computer Club's Summer Bootleg Mix)"
 "Le Castle Vania - Awake"
 "John Lord Fonda - Sound Of A Melody (Le Castle Vania Remix)"
 "Split & Jaxta - Roulette (Le Castle Vania Remix)"
 "Le Castle Vania - Play Loud"
 "Le Castle Vania - The Light"
 "Mad Owl - Glacier (Le Castle Vania Remix)"
 "Vitalic - Stamina (Le Castle Vania Remix)"
 "Walter Meego - Through A Keyhole (Le Castle Vania Remix) Prt2"
 Payday EP
 John Wick: Chapter 2 Original Motion Picture Soundtrack (contributor)
 "Le Castle Vania - Confirmed Thrills(Payday 2)"
 "Le Castle Vania - Operation Black Light(Payday 2)"
 "Le Castle Vania - The Otherside"

Discography - Lies In Disguise 
 "Lies In Disguise - Meet Your Replacement"
 "Shinichi Osawa - Electro411 (Lies In Disguise Remix)"
 "Toxic Avenger - Poker Face (Lies In Disguise Remix)"
 "Party Shank - Penis Vs Vagina (Lies In Disguise Remix)"

References

External links 

American DJs
Club DJs
Living people
Mau5trap artists
Musicians from Atlanta
Remixers
1983 births
Electronic dance music DJs